The 2022 Paris–Nice was a road cycling stage race that took place between 6 and 13 March 2022 in France. It was the 80th edition of Paris–Nice and the fourth race of the 2022 UCI World Tour.

Teams 
All 18 UCI WorldTeams and four UCI ProTeams made up the 22 teams that participated in the race. Each team entered a full squad of seven riders, for a total of 154 riders who started the race.

A wave of flu-like symptoms, although with no positive COVID-19 test results, resulted in an unusually high attrition rate as many riders were forced to withdraw from the race. A total of 37 riders withdrew before the final stage or abandoned during the stage, as most of them were not in contention for any of the final classifications. As a result, only 59 riders finished the race, which was the fewest amount since the 1985 edition.

UCI WorldTeams

 
 
 
 
 
 
 
 
 
 
 
 
 
 
 
 
 
 

UCI ProTeams

Route

Stages

Stage 1 
6 March 2022 — Mantes-la-Ville to Mantes-la-Ville,

Stage 2 
7 March 2022 — Auffargis to Orléans,

Stage 3 
8 March 2022 — Vierzon to Dun-le-Palestel,

Stage 4 
9 March 2022 — Domérat to Montluçon,  (ITT)

Stage 5 
10 March 2022 — Saint-Just-Saint-Rambert to Saint-Sauveur-de-Montagut,

Stage 6 
11 March 2022 — Courthézon to Aubagne,

Stage 7 
12 March 2022 — Nice to Col de Turini - La Bollène-Vésubie,

Stage 8 
13 March 2022 — Nice to Nice,

Classification leadership table 

 On stage 2, Primož Roglič, who was second in the points classification, wore the green jersey, because first-placed Christophe Laporte wore the yellow jersey as the leader of the general classification. On stage 3, Fabio Jakobsen wore the green jersey for the same reason.
 On stage 5, Mads Pedersen, who was second in the points classification, wore the green jersey, because first-placed Wout van Aert wore the yellow jersey as the leader of the general classification.

Final classification standings

General classification

Points classification

Mountains classification

Young rider classification

Team classification

Notes 

 As of 1 March 2022, the UCI announced that cyclists from Russia and Belarus would no longer compete under the name or flag of those respective countries due to the Russian invasion of Ukraine.

References

External links 
 

2022
2022 UCI World Tour
2022 in French sport
March 2022 sports events in France